Khasakent (Dargwa: ХӀясакент) is a rural locality (a selo) in Ebdalayansky Selsoviet, Levashinsky District, Republic of Dagestan, Russia. The population was 432 as of 2010. There are 17 streets.

Geography 
Khasakent is located 8 km southeast of Levashi (the district's administrative centre) by road. Naskent and Ebdalaya are the nearest rural localities.

Nationalities 
Dargins live there.

References 

Rural localities in Levashinsky District